"New Normal" is a song by American singer-songwriter Khalid. It was released through RCA Records as the lead single from his upcoming third studio album, Everything Is Changing, on July 21, 2021. The song was produced by John Hill, Active Child, and Blanda.

Background and composition
Khalid told press that the inspiration of "New Normal" comes from "the pandemic and the emotional toll that quarantine took on me and my friends". Khalid also told Rolling Stone that he started to write the song in the beginning of the COVID-19 pandemic and it "was my way of coping with the misunderstanding" and he also felt that it shows who he is as a person and "it just embodies hope for the outcome of our future". He also explained his inspiration for the song:Around this time last year, I was super fascinated and gravitated towards space. I was watching this comet by the name of Neowise last year, and space travel is something I've always been interested in as well. And I've been going through the motions of understanding this new, postmodern future that's coming together, especially when it comes down to technology – it's something that really excites me.

On July 8, 2021, Khalid announced the song along with its cover art and release date. He performed it live for the Virgin Galactic Unity 22 Spaceflight Launch on July 11, 2021. "New Normal" has been described as a "groovy, moody pop-R&B" song.

Music video
The official music video premiered alongside the song on July 21, 2021. It shows a reference to Silicon Valley and shows a bunch of modern items, such as "skyscraper gardens, autonomous vehicles, drone deliveries, and smart homes". The music video also shows Khalid's PlayStation 5. Andrew J. Hawkins of The Verge described the song "as smooth and breezy as a summer afternoon, which is weird because the video that accompanies the track is pretty much a venture capitalist's dream come true".

Credits and personnel
Credits adapted from Tidal.

 Khalid – vocals, songwriting
 John Hill – production, songwriting
 Active Child – production, songwriting
 Blanda – production
 Denis Kosiak – mixing, engineering, vocal production
 Connor Hedge – assistant engineering
 Fili Filizzola – assistant engineering
 Hector Vega – assistant engineering
 Dale Becker – mastering

Charts

Release history

References

2021 singles
2021 songs
Khalid (singer) songs
Songs written by Khalid (singer)
Songs written by John Hill (record producer)
Song recordings produced by John Hill (record producer)
RCA Records singles